The following teams took part in the Division II tournament which was held in Caen, France. The winner of the group was promoted to Division I (renamed IA) for the 2012 championships, while the last-placed team in the group was relegated to Division III (renamed IIA). Prior to the start of the tournament the North Korean national team announced they would withdraw, citing financial reasons. All games against them are to be counted as a forfeit, with a score of 5–0 for the opposing team.

Results

All times local (CEST/UTC+2)

 All North Korea's matches forfeited and awarded as 5–0 wins to the opposing team.

Statistics

Scoring leaders 
GP = Games played; G = Goals; A = Assists; Pts = Points; +/− = Plus-minus; PIM = Penalties In Minutes

Source: IIHF.com

Goaltending leaders 
(minimum 40% team's total ice time)

TOI = Time On Ice (minutes:seconds); GA = Goals against; GAA = Goals against average; Sv% = Save percentage; SO = Shutouts

Source: IIHF.com

Directorate Awards
Goaltender: Caroline Baldin, 
Defenseman: Kateřina Flachsová, 
Forward: Josefine Jakobsen, 
Source: IIHF.com

References

External links 
 IIHF.com
 Complete results

II
2011
2010–11 in French ice hockey
World